Bare Island may refer to:

Bare Island (Massachusetts)
Bare Island (New South Wales)
Bare Island, New Zealand